John Byabagambi (born 8 May 1958) is a Ugandan engineer and politician. He was the Cabinet Minister for Karamoja Affairs, in the Cabinet of Uganda. He was appointed to that position on 6 June 2016, and was replaced by Mary Goretti Kitutu on 8 June 2021. He previously served as Minister of Works and Transport between March 2015 and June 2016, replacing Abraham Byandala who was appointed Minister Without Portfolio. He is also the elected Member of Parliament, representing Ibanda County South, Ibanda District. He was first elected to that position in 2001.

Background and education
John Byabagambi was born in Ibanda District on 8 May 1958. He attended St. Leo's College Kyegobe in Fort Portal, for his O-Level education, graduating in 1973. For his A-Level studies, he studied at St. Henry's College Kitovu in Masaka, graduating in 1979. He holds the degree of Master of Science in Chemical Engineering. The university where he obtained his bachelor's degree is not stated.

Career
Prior to joining politics in 2001, he worked as an Engineer in several private businesses. In 1989, he worked as a Production Engineer at Miroko Industries. From 1991 until 1992, he worked as the General Manager of Mukwano Industries Limited, a member company of the Mukwano Group of Companies. Between 1992 and 2001, he worked as the General manager, Songdol Films Uganda Limited. In 2001, he entered politics and contested for the parliamentary seat of Ibanda County South in Ibanda District. He won in 2001 and was re-elected in 2006 on the National Resistance Movement (NRM) political party ticket. After serving as Minister of Works and Transport from 1 March 2015 until 6 June 2016, he was reassigned to Cabinet Minister for Karamoja on 6 June 2016. He left the cabinet on 8 June 2021.

Personal life
He is married. He belongs to the National Resistance Movement political party. His interests include reading and traveling.

See also
 Cabinet of Uganda
 Parliament of Uganda
 Ibanda District

References

1958 births
Living people
People from Ibanda District
Members of the Parliament of Uganda
Government ministers of Uganda
National Resistance Movement politicians
People from Western Region, Uganda
21st-century Ugandan politicians
People educated at St. Leo's College, Kyegobe